Stephen G. Rabe is a historian based in the United States. Born in Hartford, Connecticut, he received degrees from Hamilton College and the University of Connecticut. His areas of interest include the relations between the US and Latin America, the Vietnam War, and slavery in the US. Rabe has held a Fulbright Distinguished Chair and the Bicentennial Chair in American Studies at the University of Helsinki.

Rabe's work has been recognized by grants, awards, and prizes from the National Endowment for the Humanities, the American Historical Association, the Lyndon Baines Johnson Foundation, the Rockefeller Archive Center, the Eleanor Roosevelt Institute, the Harvey O. Johnson Prize, the Stuart L. Bernath Prize from the Society for Historians of American Foreign Relations, and the Bernath Lecture Prize.

Bibliography

References
 Dr. Stephen Rabe Awarded Bicentennial Chair In American Studies at the University of Helsinki. . University of Texas at Dallas, 2005.
 STEPHEN G. RABE. University of Texas at Dallas. .

Fulbright Distinguished Chairs
Historians of the United States
Living people
Year of birth missing (living people)